Knowlton is a census-designated place in the town of Knowlton, Marathon County, Wisconsin, United States. Its population was 120 as of the 2010 census. The northern terminus for Wisconsin Highway 34 is located just north of Knowlton and the highway passes through the community.

Images

References

Census-designated places in Marathon County, Wisconsin
Census-designated places in Wisconsin